The William E. Curtis House (also known as the John F. Durack House) is a historic home in Tampa, Florida; located at 808 East Curtis Street.  On August 27, 1987, it was added to the U.S. National Register of Historic Places. Curtis was a nurseryman

Built around 1905 - 1906, the house is one of the oldest residential structures in Tampa's Seminole Heights neighborhoods.  The two-story, frame structure is an example of Dutch Colonial Revival style and features a gambrel roof.

References

Additional sources and external links
 Hillsborough County listings at National Register of Historic Places
 Florida's Office of Cultural and Historical Programs
 Hillsborough County listings

Houses in Tampa, Florida
History of Tampa, Florida
Houses on the National Register of Historic Places in Hillsborough County, Florida
Dutch Colonial Revival architecture in the United States
Houses completed in 1906
1906 establishments in Florida